Dresden: In Concert is a double-disc live album by Norwegian saxophonist Jan Garbarek. The double album was released in 2009 on the ECM label, almost forty years after his first record for them (1970). It was Garbarek's first live album with his own group, recorded in the German city of Dresden in 2007.

Track listing 
All compositions by Jan Garbarek, unless otherwise noted

CD 1
 Paper Nut  – 7:55
 The Tall Tear Trees – 5:14
 Heitor – 9:16
 Twelve Moons – 10:43
 Rondo Amoroso  – 6:59
 Tao  – 4:45
 Milagre dos Peixes  – 12:53

CD 2
 There Were Swallows – 7:18
 The Reluctant Saxophonist – 8:20
 Transformations  – 7:18
 Once I Dreamt a Tree Upside Down – 7:18
 Fugl – 6:00
 Maracuja – 7:44
 Grooving Out!  – 3:26
 Nu Bein' – 5:52
 Voy Cantando – 11:14

Personnel 
 Jan Garbarek – soprano saxophone, tenor saxophone, willow flute
 Rainer Brüninghaus – piano, keyboards
 Yuri Daniel – electric bass
 Manu Katché – drums

References

External links 
 Jan Garbarek Group - Dresden: In Concert (2009) album review by Thom Jurek, credits & releases at AllMusic
 Jan Garbarek Group - Dresden: In Concert (2009) album releases & credits at Discogs
 Jan Garbarek Group - Dresden: In Concert (2009) album credits & user reviews at ProgArchives.com
 Jan Garbarek Group - Dresden (2009) album to be listened as stream on Spotify

Jan Garbarek albums
2009 live albums
ECM Records albums
Albums produced by Manfred Eicher